K. Michelle: My Life is a reality television series featuring K. Michelle. It premiered on November 3, 2014, on VH1 and is the first spin-off of Love & Hip Hop: Atlanta. In January 2015, VH1 renewed the show for a second season, which premiered on January 25, 2016.

Series synopsis

Overview and casting
K. Michelle: My Life chronicles the everyday life of R&B/soul singer and songwriter K. Michelle.

Several members of K's inner circle appear as supporting cast members in confessional interview segments throughout the series. They include K's best friend Paris Phillips, her "gay husband", make-up artist and hair stylist Jonathan Fernandez, night club promoter Nema Kamar and Tracie Renee, K's old friend from Memphis, Tennessee, who is attempting to repair her relationship with K after allegedly stealing money from her. The first season ended with an epilogue, with K revealing that Paris allegedly stole money from her and they are no longer friends, and that she had also cut ties with Nema and Tracee. K's son Chase Bowman, her mother Angles Pate, life coach Tony Gaskins, Arsenio Hall, Joseline Hernandez, Karlie Redd and Russell Simmons made guest appearances.

The show returned for a second season, with P. London, an aspiring rapper, joining the cast. London made headlines in 2014 when a female police officer was suspended for appearing in her music video "What's Up, Bitch?". The season featured guest appearances from K's on-again, off-again boyfriend Bobby Maze, his aunt Aunt CC, Trina, producers Pop & Oak, Safaree Samuels, Prince Mario Max Schaumburg-Lippe and Love & Hip Hop: Atlantas Jessica Dime.

The show was renewed for a third season, with K's sister Shalah Pate, an aspiring motivational speaker and social worker, joining the cast. K. Michelle announced on social media that it would be her last. The season featured guest appearances from K's ex-girlfriend Melisia Lomax, her boyfriend Dr. Kastan Sims, high school friend Viara Iyadunni, her father Eddie Pate, her artist Gabby Green, T-Pain, Harmony Samuels, Dreezy and Big Tigger. The show ended with its series finale on February 6, 2017.

Cast timeline

Storylines
The first season chronicles K. Michelle's move to New York City and the recording of her second album Anybody Wanna Buy a Heart?. The second season chronicles her life in Los Angeles and the recording of her third album More Issues Than Vogue. The third season chronicles her return to Atlanta and the launch of her new restaurant Puff & Petals, as well as a trip to her hometown of Memphis and the recording of her fourth album Kimberly: The People I Used to Know.

K. Michelle's love life is also a focus of the show, including her volatile, on-again, off-again relationship with basketball player Bobby Maze and her romantic dalliances with Safaree Samuels and Prince Mario Max Schaumburg-Lippe. In season three, Michelle reveals her bisexuality and reunites with her ex-girlfriend Melisia. The series ends with her finding love and planning a family with Memphis dentist Dr. Kastan Sims.

Episodes

Series overview

Season 1 (2014)

Season 2 (2016)

Season 3 (2016–17)

References

External links
 

Love & Hip Hop
2010s American reality television series
2014 American television series debuts
K. Michelle
2017 American television series endings
English-language television shows
VH1 original programming
Television shows set in New York City
Television shows set in Los Angeles
Television shows set in Atlanta
American television spin-offs
Reality television spin-offs